Loraine K. Obler is an American neuroscientist, currently a Distinguished Professor at City University of New York, and also a published author. She is a Fellow of the American Psychological Society and also holder of the Erasmus Mundus Visiting Scholar at Universität Potsdam. She is also a co-head of the Language in the Aging Brain Laboratory of the Boston University School of Medicine Harold Goodglass Aphasia Research Center at the Boston VA Healthcare Center.

Education

1975 Ph.D., 1973 M.A., 1970 M.A., 1969 B.A., 1966 University of Michigan

References

1948 births
Living people
American neuroscientists
American women neuroscientists
City University of New York faculty
University of Michigan alumni
Academic staff of the Hebrew University of Jerusalem
Emerson College faculty
American women academics
21st-century American women